Andrew Hunter (August 1864 in Joppa, Ayrshire, Scotland – 19 June 1888 in Australia) was a Scottish footballer known for scoring Aston Villa's first goal in the FA Cup.

He also played for Ayr Thistle, Third Lanark and Vale of Leven, before coming to England. Like his more famous brother, Archie, who captained Aston Villa in the same period, he died young from a heart attack. Another brother, John, was a Scotland international.

References

Scottish footballers
1864 births
1888 deaths
Aston Villa F.C. players
Third Lanark A.C. players
Vale of Leven F.C. players
Association football forwards
Footballers from South Ayrshire